Fritz Roth (born 1900, date of death unknown) was a Swiss wrestler. He competed in the freestyle light heavyweight event at the 1924 Summer Olympics.

References

1900 births
Year of death missing
Olympic wrestlers of Switzerland
Wrestlers at the 1924 Summer Olympics
Swiss male sport wrestlers
Place of birth missing